is the joint pen name of Japanese manga artists  and her younger sister . They made their professional debut in 1976 with Ganbare Aneko in Shōjo Comic.

In 1977, Muroyama published  Asari-chan, which was collected in 100 volumes and which had sold 26,500,000 volumes total as of May 2006, making it the seventh best-selling shōjo manga ever in Japan. Asari-chan received the 1986 Shogakukan Manga Award for children's manga. Several of Muroyama's manga have been adapted as anime, including Asari-chan as both a television series and theatrical movie, Dororonpa! as a television series, and Mr. Pen Pen as a television special.

References

External links
 Official Website 
 
 Interview with Mariko Muroyama

Living people
Women manga artists
Manga artists from Kumamoto Prefecture
Japanese female comics artists
Female comics writers
Japanese women writers
Japanese writers
Year of birth missing (living people)
Collective pseudonyms
Sibling duos
Writing duos
Pseudonymous women writers
21st-century pseudonymous writers